Venture Stores, Inc. was a chain of retail stores aimed at the discount department-store market. John Geisse, formerly of Target Stores, and May Department Stores' executive vice president, Dave Babcock, founded the chain in 1968. Venture Stores expanded to operate over 70 stores with major market share in St. Louis, Chicago, and Kansas City, and expanded across various areas in the United States over a period of nearly 30 years, becoming the largest discount chain in Chicago. In January 1998, Venture Stores entered a Chapter 11 bankruptcy and closed within six months.

History
The chain was founded in 1968 when Target founder John F. Geisse went to work for May Department Stores. Under an antitrust settlement reached with the Department of Justice, May was unable to acquire any more retail chains at the time, and the department-store company needed a way to compete against the emerging discount-store chains. When May's  Dave Babcock learned that Geisse had resigned from Target Stores, he spoke with Geisse about starting a new discount retailer, resulting in the founding of Venture.

The first Venture store opened in 1970 in the  St. Louis suburb of Fairview Heights, Illinois - store #002. Land had been purchased for store #001 in the St. Louis suburb of Overland, Missouri but a building was never constructed. In 1976, Geisse retired and left Venture Stores, which had by that time expanded to 20 units.

In 1978, Venture Stores purchased 23 Turn Style locations in the Chicago area from Jewel food stores, and expanded to over 40 locations in the Chicago market area, with many city locations. It was the largest discount chain in Chicago with inner-city locations other than Zayre/Ames. In 1990, Venture separated from May and became a private corporation.

Venture's advertising slogan during the 1980s was "Save at Venture, Save With Style". or "SWS". In the 1990s, Venture  employed two other slogans; the first, tied to a companywide remodeling initiative aimed at making the stores more like Kohl's, was "See What's New For You!". At the time Venture closed, its slogan was "See What A Little Money Can Buy".

Dining

As was a common trend in American department stores, many Venture stores offered a dining area inside the store, typically called Cafe Venture. This area sold standard American fare, such as hamburgers and pizza, although one could also get a "hot dog with the ends cut off." The dining area also contained a second area that sold popcorn, pretzels, and Icee drinks.

Corporate affairs
The Venture corporate  headquarters were located in O'Fallon, Missouri.

Bankruptcy

By the late 1990s, the chain found that it was unable to compete against other retail chains, such as Kmart, Target, and Wal-Mart. Venture tried to return to its founding principles as an upscale discounter and remodeled most of its 90+ stores. While facing vast competition, Venture made a fatal mistake trying to expand into Texas instead of protecting its core markets. Venture sold the Texas stores to Kmart in 1996 and closed its distribution center in Corsicana, Texas. The company entered chapter 11 bankruptcy on January 20, 1998, and tried to operate with a smaller number of stores. The effort was not successful, and the company announced its closing on April 27, 1998. Liquidation of store inventory continued through July 1998. Most of the former Venture buildings were absorbed into other chains, primarily Kmart (for their new Big Kmart stores at the time), the final of which was located in Crystal City, Missouri, which closed permanently in March 2019. Others were absorbed by Kohl's, ShopKo, and Burlington Coat Factory.

References

External links
Television commercials at The Museum of Classic Chicago Television

Retail companies established in 1970
Companies based in St. Louis County, Missouri
Defunct discount stores of the United States
Retail companies disestablished in 1998
1970 establishments in Missouri
1998 disestablishments in Missouri
Companies that filed for Chapter 11 bankruptcy in 1998